NBC 40 may refer to one of the following television stations in the United States:

Current
WNKY in Bowling Green, Kentucky
WTWC-TV in Tallahassee, Florida

Former
WINR-TV/WICZ-TV in Binghamton, New York (1957 to 1996)
WMGM-TV in Atlantic City, New Jersey (1966 to 2014)